The O2 Store is a chain of retail stores operated by Telefónica Europe, specializing in mobile phones. As of January 2014, O2 has opened over 450 stores in the United Kingdom. O2 Stores come in 2 formats - Franchise and Retail. The latter are owned and maintained by O2 UK directly, as opposed to private investors. The majority of stores have an O2 Guru, effectively a Technical Specialist. This free service is offered to all consumers, whether they are a Telefonica customer or not.

Design and innovation

Microsoft Surface 

Aside from general information, mobile phones are the central motive for visiting an O2 store and this is where the Microsoft Surface Table is being implemented in a selection of stores. Customers can interactively choose from a selection of mobile phones. Data is displayed directly from the existing O2 backend systems and thus are always up to date. Using the touch-sensitive surface, users can filter for desired features, compare handsets and view them from various angles more easily.

Locations

See also 
 O2 (Ireland)
 Telefónica Czech Republic
 Telefónica Slovakia

References 

Store